Pediatric Research is a monthly peer-reviewed medical journal in the field of pediatrics and the official publication of the American Pediatric Society, the European Society for Paediatric Research, and the Society for Pediatric Research. It is published for the International Pediatric Research Foundation by Springer Nature. The editor-in-chief is Cynthia F. Bearer. The journal had a 2020 impact factor of 3.75.

References

External links
 

Publications established in 1967
Pediatrics journals
English-language journals
Monthly journals
Nature Research academic journals